Carys Davina Grey-Thompson, Baroness Grey-Thompson,  (born 26 July 1969), is a Welsh life peeress, television presenter and former wheelchair racer.

Athletic career
Grey-Thompson's Paralympic career started in the 100m at the Junior National Games for Wales in 1984.

Her international career began in 1988 in Seoul, where she won a bronze medal in the 400m. As a young athlete she also competed in wheelchair basketball. Her fifth and last Paralympic Games were in Athens (2004) where she won two gold medals in wheelchair racing in the 100m and 400m. In total in her Paralympic career she won 16 medals (11 gold, four silver and a bronze)  and also 13 World Championship medals (six gold, five silver and two bronze).

On 27 February 2007, Grey-Thompson announced her pending retirement, with her last appearance for Great Britain at May's Paralympic World Cup in Manchester.

Over her career, she won a total of 16 Paralympic medals, including 11 golds, held over 30 world records and won the London Marathon six times between 1992 and 2002.

Post-retirement

Career in television
In preparation for her retirement from the track, she expanded her television presenting career on BBC Wales and S4C, as well as BBC One.

She was the first female wheelchair user in the world to present on television on BBC2's ground-breaking series for disabled people From the Edge.

She has also presented BBC Wales X-ray, Big Welsh Challenge, Land of our Mothers, and worked for BBC Radio Wales, Five Live, and Radio Cleveland. She was a key member of the BBC commentary team at the Beijing Paralympics 2008, and of subsequent Paralympics.

Advisory and consultant roles

During her competitive career she sat on the board of the National Disability Council, The Sports Council for Wales, the English Lottery Awards Panel and UK Sport, and also sat for three years on the Mission 2012 panel (part of UK Sport). Grey-Thompson also sat on the board of the London Marathon (2007–2018), the board of Transport for London (2008–2018) and currently sits on the London Legacy Development Corporation. She chairs the board of ukactive.

Grey-Thompson is patron of numerous charities including the Duke of Edinburgh Awards scheme, the Wembley Stadium Legacy Trust, the Guernsey Disability Alliance and Zoё's Place Baby Hospice, a charity for sick babies and young children. She is also President of Sportsleaders UK, a UNICEF Ambassador, academy member of the Laureus World Sport Academy (trustee of the Sport for Good Foundation) and a Council member for the Winston Churchill Memorial Trust.

As well as this, she is the Patron of the Tees Wheelyboats Club, a group providing disabled people with access to the River Tees,

In July 2011, Grey-Thompson was announced as the President of the Leadership 20:20 Commission, the commission on the future leadership of Civil Society. She launched the commission's recommendations in Parliament on 14 December 2011.

Previously, she has also been a Trustee of V, the Tony Blair Sports Foundation, Sportsaid Foundation (of which she was a recipient as a young athlete), an International Inspiration Ambassador and Chair of the Women's Sports and Fitness Foundation Commission on the Future of Women's Sport.

Grey-Thompson has also been the Chancellor of Northumbria University since July 2015.

In December 2021, Grey-Thompson was appointed as Chair of the North of Tyne Combined Authority's Inclusive Economy Board.

Parliamentary career
On 23 March 2010, Grey-Thompson was created a life peer on the recommendation of the House of Lords Appointments Commission (HOLAC). Despite previously suggesting a desire for a title with a Welsh connection, her title was conferred as Baroness Grey-Thompson, of Eaglescliffe in Stockton-On-Tees on 23 March 2010.

Grey-Thompson was introduced in the House of Lords on 29 March, swearing the oath of allegiance in both English and Welsh and sits as a crossbencher.

In August 2014, Grey-Thompson was one of 200 public figures who were signatories to a letter to The Guardian opposing Scottish independence in the run-up to September's referendum on that issue.

Honours
In 1993, she was appointed Member of the Order of the British Empire (MBE) for "services to Athletics for the Disabled", advanced in 2000 to Officer of the Order of the British Empire (OBE), and then in 2005 was promoted to Dame Commander of the Order of the British Empire (DBE), in both cases for "services to disabled sport".

Grey-Thompson was named the BBC Wales Sports Personality of the Year three times; in 1992, 2000 and 2004. In 2000, she came third in the BBC Sports Personality of the Year, behind Steve Redgrave and Denise Lewis. That year she also received the Helen Rollason Award for her performance at the 2000 Summer Paralympics. In August 2009, she was made a member of the Gorsedd at the 2009 National Eisteddfod in Bala, Gwynedd.

Willenhall School Sports College, West Midlands has named a house in her honour, where each of the eight houses is named after influential sports stars and local heroes. Roundwood Park School set up a house system in 2011. In July 2012, the blue house became Grey-Thompson house.

In November 2012, she was appointed to the three-person commission that has been set up by the Union Cycliste Internationale to investigate the Lance Armstrong doping affair.

In February 2013, she was assessed as one of the 100 most powerful women in the United Kingdom by Woman's Hour on BBC Radio 4. In the same year, she was also recognized as one of the BBC's 100 women.

In June 2018, she was inducted into Power Brands LIFE – Hall of Fame at London International Forum for Equality.

In January 2019, she was chosen as a contender for the "Greatest Person of the 20th Century" in the BBC Icons series but did not proceed beyond the 'Sports Stars' heat.

On 15 December 2019, she was given the BBC Sports Personality of the Year Lifetime Achievement Award.

Honorary degrees
Grey-Thompson has received numerous honorary degrees including Honorary Doctorates from Oxford University, Oxford Brookes University, the University of Greenwich, the University of Bath, Newcastle University, Liverpool John Moores, the University of Leicester, Sheffield Hallam University, University of Hull, University of Exeter, Heriot Watt University, the Open University, University of Wales Newport, the University of Wales, Leeds Metropolitan University, Loughborough University (both a Master and Doctorate), Teesside University, York and Ripon College, University of Swansea, University of Glamorgan, UWIC, University of Surrey, Southampton University, Manchester Metropolitan University, Staffordshire University and Cardiff University. Grey-Thompson received a Lifetime Achievement Award and another Honorary Doctorate from the University of East London in May 2011, at the university's annual Sports Award evening held at West Ham United's Upton Park stadium.

In July 2013, she received an Honorary Doctorate of Science (HonDSc) in recognition of her outstanding service to disability and to disadvantaged people, and to her promotion of sport and the Paralympics.

On 15 June 2016, she was awarded the degree of Doctor of Law (honoris causa) by the University of Cambridge.

Personal life
Grey-Thompson has spina bifida and is a wheelchair user. She was christened Carys Davina Grey, but her sister, Sian who is 2 years older than Tanni, referred to her as "tiny" when she first saw her, pronouncing it "tanni"; the nickname stuck.

Grey-Thompson attended St Cyres Comprehensive School. She graduated from Loughborough University in 1991 with a BA (Hons) degree in Politics and Social Administration.

She is married to Ian Thompson, a research chemist and former wheelchair athlete. They live at Eaglescliffe, Stockton-on-Tees; they have one daughter.

Her autobiography Seize the Day was published by Hodder and Stoughton in 2001.

Paralympic World Cup medals

Bibliography

Styles and honours
Ms Tanni Grey MBE (1993–1999)
Mrs Tanni Grey-Thompson MBE (1999–2000)
Mrs Tanni Grey-Thompson OBE (2000–2005)
Dame Tanni Grey-Thompson DBE (2005–2010)
The Baroness Grey-Thompson DBE (2010–2012)
The Baroness Grey-Thompson DBE DL (2012–present)

References
Note – #British Disabled Flying Association (2005). Dame Tanni Grey-Thompson OBE, MBE – new patron for the BDFA. Retrieved 31 December 2005.

External links
Profile, Debretts.com; accessed 7 April 2016.

1969 births
Living people
Sportspeople from Cardiff
People from Eaglescliffe
Sportspeople from County Durham
People with spina bifida
Welsh female wheelchair racers
Sportswomen with disabilities
British sportsperson-politicians
Welsh people with disabilities
Olympic wheelchair racers of Great Britain
Wheelchair racers at the 1992 Summer Olympics
Wheelchair racers at the 1996 Summer Olympics
Wheelchair racers at the 2000 Summer Olympics
Wheelchair racers at the 2004 Summer Olympics
Paralympic athletes of Great Britain
Paralympic gold medalists for Great Britain
Paralympic silver medalists for Great Britain
Paralympic bronze medalists for Great Britain
Wheelchair category Paralympic competitors
Paralympic wheelchair racers
Athletes (track and field) at the 1988 Summer Paralympics
Athletes (track and field) at the 1992 Summer Paralympics
Athletes (track and field) at the 1996 Summer Paralympics
Athletes (track and field) at the 2000 Summer Paralympics
Athletes (track and field) at the 2004 Summer Paralympics
Medalists at the 1988 Summer Paralympics
Medalists at the 1992 Summer Paralympics
Medalists at the 1996 Summer Paralympics
Medalists at the 2000 Summer Paralympics
Television presenters with disabilities
Wheelchair basketball players at the 1988 Summer Paralympics
Commonwealth Games competitors for Wales
London Marathon winners
Bards of the Gorsedd
Dames Commander of the Order of the British Empire
Deputy Lieutenants of North Yorkshire
Sporting dames
People's peers
Crossbench life peers
Alumni of Loughborough University
People educated at St Cyres Comprehensive School
Royalty and nobility with disabilities
BBC 100 Women
BBC Board members
Welsh Paralympic competitors
The Sunday Times Sportswoman of the Year winners
Medalists at the 2004 Summer Paralympics
Paralympic medalists in athletics (track and field)
Athletes (track and field) at the 2006 Commonwealth Games
Life peeresses created by Elizabeth II